The 2016 season was IFK Göteborg's 111th in existence, their 84th season in Allsvenskan and their 40th consecutive season in the league. They competed in Allsvenskan, Svenska Cupen where they were knocked out in the group stage and in qualification for the UEFA Europa League where they were knocked out in the play-off round. League play started on 3 April and ended on 6 November.

Key events
 30 August 2015: Defender Benjamin Zalo joins the club on a three-year contract, transferring from FK Ørn-Horten.
 1 November 2015: Goalkeeper Johan Hagman leaves the club.
 2 November 2015: Goalkeeper John Alvbåge signs a new three-year contract, keeping him at the club until the end of the 2018 season.
 6 November 2015: Goalkeeper Erik Dahlin joins the club on a two-year contract, transferring from IK Oddevold.
 11 November 2015: Forward Riku Riski leaves the club and returns to Rosenborg BK as his loan contract expires.
 11 November 2015: Goalkeeper Marcus Sandberg leaves the club, transferring to Vålerenga.
 12 November 2015: Midfielder Karl Bohm leaves the club. On 1 February 2016, he joined Utsiktens BK.
 1 December 2015: Defender Patrick Dyrestam leaves the club on loan to Ängelholms FF for the duration of the season.
 3 December 2015: Italian Kappa is announced to be the club's new kit manufacturer for four years.
 4 December 2015: Club director Martin Kurzwelly is being sacked.
 5 December 2015: Forward Patrik Karlsson Lagemyr is promoted to the first-team squad, signing a two-year contract to keep him at the club until the end of the 2017 season.
 7 December 2015: Defender Hjálmar Jónsson signs a new one-year contract, keeping him at the club until the end of the season.
 22 December 2015: Defender Billy Nordström signs a new one-year contract, keeping him at the club until the end of the season.
 14 January 2016: Midfielder Gustav Svensson leaves the club, transferring to Guangzhou R&F.
 26 January 2016: Forward Tobias Hysén joins the club on a two-year contract, transferring Shanghai SIPG
 8 February 2016: Chairman Karl Jartun announces his resignation from the club.
 13 February 2016: Forward Malick Mané leaves the club. On 26 February, he joined Taraz.
 16 February 2016: Defender Hjörtur Hermannsson joins the club on a loan deal until 22 July 2016, transferring from PSV.
 20 February 2016: Goalkeeper John Alvbåge is selected as 2015 Archangel of the Year, an annual price given by the Supporterklubben Änglarna to a player who has shown a great loyalty to IFK Göteborg.
 7 March 2016: Frank Andersson is selected as new chairman at the annual meeting.
 30 March 2016: Goalkeeper Oliver Gustafsson joins the club on a three-month contract, transferring from GAIS.
 31 March 2016: Director of sports Mats Gren is announced as new caretaker club director.
 31 March 2016: Defender Mauricio Albornoz joins the club on a loan deal until 30 June 2016, transferring from Åtvidabergs FF.
 5 July 2016: Goalkeeper Oliver Gustafsson signs a new one-month contract, keeping him at the club until 31 July 2016.
 5 July 2016: Defender Mauricio Albornoz leaves the club and returns to Åtvidabergs FF as his loan contract expires.
 7 July 2016: Defender Hjörtur Hermannsson leaves the club and returns to PSV as he transfers to Brøndby IF.
 27 July 2016: Forward Victor Sköld leaves the club, transferring to Örebro SK.
 27 July 2016: Goalkeeper Oliver Gustafsson leaves the club, transferring to Ljungskile SK.
 4 August 2016: Defender Haitam Aleesami leaves the club, transferring to Palermo.
 8 August 2016: Forward Elías Már Ómarsson joins the club on a loan deal for the rest of the season, transferring from Vålerenga.
 11 August 2016: Defender Scott Jamieson joins the club, transferring from Western Sydney Wanderers.
 31 August 2016: Forward Gustav Engvall leaves the club, transferring to Bristol City.

Players

Squad

Transfers

In

Out

Squad statistics

Appearances and goals

Disciplinary record

Club

Coaching staff

Other information

Competitions

Overall

Allsvenskan

League table

Results summary

Results by round

Matches
Kickoff times are in UTC+2 unless stated otherwise.

Svenska Cupen

2015–16
The tournament continued from the 2015 season.

Kickoff times are in UTC+1.

Group stage

2016–17
The tournament continued into the 2017 season.

Qualification stage

UEFA Europa League

Kickoff times are in UTC+2 unless stated otherwise.

Qualifying phase and play-off round

First qualifying round

Second qualifying round

Third qualifying round

Play-off round

Non competitive

Pre-season
Kickoff times are in UTC+1 unless stated otherwise.

Mid-season

Notes

References

IFK Göteborg seasons
IFK Goteborg